Tamara Csipes (born 24 August 1989) is a Hungarian sprint canoeist who has competed since the late 2000s. At the 2020 Summer Olympics, she won a gold medal  in Women's K-4 500 metres, and a silver medal in the Women's K-1 500 metres

Career
At the 2010 ICF Canoe Sprint World Championships in Poznań, she won two gold medals earning them in the K-2 1000 m and K-4 500 m events. In 2015 Csipes was suspended for four months after she failed a drug test.

She competed at the 2018 ICF Canoe Sprint World Championships, and 2019 ICF Canoe Sprint World Championships.

Awards
 Junior Príma award (2008)
 Excellent Athlete of Újbuda (2009)
 Hungarian Sportswoman of the Year – votes of sports journalists: 2011
 Perpetual champion of Hungarian Kayak-Canoe (2014)
   Order of Merit of Hungary – Officer's Cross (2016)

References

External links
 
 
 
 

1989 births
Living people
Canoeists from Budapest
Hungarian female canoeists
ICF Canoe Sprint World Championships medalists in kayak
Doping cases in canoeing
Canoeists at the 2016 Summer Olympics
Canoeists at the 2020 Summer Olympics
Olympic canoeists of Hungary
Olympic gold medalists for Hungary
Olympic silver medalists for Hungary
Olympic medalists in canoeing
Medalists at the 2016 Summer Olympics
Medalists at the 2020 Summer Olympics
Canoeists at the 2019 European Games
European Games medalists in canoeing
European Games gold medalists for Hungary
21st-century Hungarian women